This is a list of the governors of the province of Daykundi, Afghanistan.

Governors of Daykundi Province

See also
 List of current governors of Afghanistan

Notes

Daykundi